The UEFA European Under-18 Championship 1964 Final Tournament was held in the Netherlands.

Teams
The following teams entered the tournament:

 
 
 
 
 
 
 
 
 
 
 
 
  (host)

Group stage

Group 1

Group 2

Group 3

Group 4

Group 5

Group 6

Group 7

Group 8

Quarterfinals

Semifinals

Third place match

Final

External links
Results by RSSSF

UEFA European Under-19 Championship
Under-18
UEFA European Under-18 Championship
1964
UEFA European Under-18 Championship
UEFA European Under-18 Championship
UEFA European Under-18 Championship